Eknath Shinde  is the current Leader of the House of the Maharashtra Legislative Assembly.

Leader of the House 
 
The Assembly has a Leader of the House, who heads the government caucus. The office is provided for in the Legislative Council Rules, which defines it as "Chief Minister or any other Minister appointed by Chief Minister". The Rules further mandate that the Chairperson should conduct parliamentary business in consultation with the Leader.

See also
List of governors of Maharashtra
List of chief ministers of Maharashtra

References

Politics of Maharashtra